Nicholas Colin Bignall (born 11 July 1990) is an English semi-professional footballer who plays as a forward. A product of the Reading academy, he played on loan for a number of Football League clubs before recurring injuries forced him to drop into non-league football.

Playing career

Reading 
A forward or left winger, Bignall began his career in the academy at Reading and scored 20 goals for the U18 during the course of his two-year scholarship. He signed a two-year professional contract ahead of the 2008–09 season and spent much of the campaign away on loan, impressing enough to sign a new two-year contract in April 2009. Bignall made his debut for the Royals with a start in a League Cup first round match versus Burton Albion on 11 August 2009 and scored two goals in the 5–1 victory. He also started in the following round versus Barnsley, before leaving the club on loan and returning early through injury on 21 December 2009. He returned to fitness in January 2010 and made one further appearance during the 2009–10 season, as a substitute for Simon Church after 74 minutes of a 1–0 victory over Barnsley on 30 January.

Bignall made what would be his final Reading appearance early in the 2010–11 season, with a start in a 1–0 League Cup first round extra time victory over Torquay United on 11 August 2010. He signed a new two-year contract in October 2010, but subsequently spent much of the remainder of the 2010–11 season away on loan. Bignall failed to receive a call into the first team squad during the early months of the 2011–12 season and suffered a season-ending injury while away on loan in October 2011. Bignall's contract expired in June 2012, but remained with the club on a non-contract basis in a bid to return to fitness. He finally departed in 2014.

Loan spells 
Between 2008 and 2011, Bignall spent much of his Reading career away on loan from the Madejski Stadium and made 53 appearances and scored five goals for League One clubs Northampton Town, Cheltenham Town, Stockport County, Southampton, Bournemouth, Brentford, Exeter City and Wycombe Wanderers.

Non-League football 
In March 2014, Bignall dropped into non-League football to join Conference South club Basingstoke Town and he was a part of the squad which won the 2013–14 Hampshire Senior Cup. He departed the club early in the 2014–15 season and had short spells with National League South clubs Sutton United and Hayes & Yeading United, before returning to The Camrose late in the campaign. He departed for the final time during the 2015 off-season and had short spells with Lincoln City and Gainsborough Trinity, before joining National League South club Hungerford Town in 2016. He remained at Bulpit Lane until his departure at the end of the 2017–18 season. After a year out of football, Bignall played for Isthmian League South Central Division clubs Bracknell Town and Uxbridge during the 2019–20 season.

Coaching career 
In September 2018, it was reported that Bignall had returned to Reading to coach in the club's academy, as part of a coaching degree course at Oxford Brookes University.

Personal life 
Bignall is colour blind.

Career statistics

Honours 
Basingstoke Town

 Hampshire Senior Cup: 2013–14

References

External links 

Nicholas Bignall at readingfc.co.uk

1990 births
Living people
Sportspeople from Reading, Berkshire
English footballers
Association football wingers
Association football forwards
Reading F.C. players
Northampton Town F.C. players
Cheltenham Town F.C. players
Stockport County F.C. players
Southampton F.C. players
AFC Bournemouth players
Brentford F.C. players
Exeter City F.C. players
Wycombe Wanderers F.C. players
Basingstoke Town F.C. players
Sutton United F.C. players
Hayes & Yeading United F.C. players
Gainsborough Trinity F.C. players
Hungerford Town F.C. players
Gosport Borough F.C. players
English Football League players
National League (English football) players
Lincoln City F.C. players
Biggleswade Town F.C. players
Southern Football League players
Bracknell Town F.C. players
Isthmian League players
Uxbridge F.C. players
Footballers from Berkshire